Glycomyces arizonensis is a bacterium from the genus of Glycomyces which has been isolated from soil from a kangaroo rat burrow from Arizona in the United States.

References 

Actinomycetia
Bacteria described in 2004